Marlene Kahler (born 15 May 2001) is an Austrian swimmer. She competed in the women's 200 metre freestyle at the 2019 World Aquatics Championships. In 2021, she competed in the 2020 Olympics.

References

External links
 

2001 births
Living people
Place of birth missing (living people)
Swimmers at the 2018 Summer Youth Olympics
Austrian female freestyle swimmers
Swimmers at the 2020 Summer Olympics
Olympic swimmers of Austria
21st-century Austrian women